Melamchi River (Nepali: मेलम्चि खोला) is a tributary of the Indrawati River. It originates from the Jugal Himal at an elevation of about  amsl. It joins with the Indrawati River at Melamchi Bazaar.

Morphology
The river flows southwards and widens downstream.

Hydrology
The mean annual flow is 9.7 m3/s. The maximum flow is 289 m3/s.

Infrastructure
Melamchi Water Supply Project in the river diverts water from the river to Kathmandu for drinking.

Incidents
 In June 2021, a flood of the river damaged the Melamchi Bazaar killing several locals and some foreigners.

See also
List of rivers of Nepal

References

Rivers of Bagmati Province